Ian Thompson (Ian Ronald Thompson; 8 December 1968 – 15 March 1999) was a Bahamian high jumper.

Career

He finished eleventh at the 1995 World Championships. He won the Central American and Caribbean Junior Championships in 1988.

He died in March 1999 and the Bahamian 4x100 metre women's relay team dedicated their gold medal in the 1999 World Championships to him.

Achievements

References

External links

Profile at Sports-Reference.com

1968 births
1999 deaths
Bahamian male high jumpers
Athletes (track and field) at the 1992 Summer Olympics
Athletes (track and field) at the 1994 Commonwealth Games
Athletes (track and field) at the 1996 Summer Olympics
Olympic athletes of the Bahamas
Commonwealth Games competitors for the Bahamas